The National Culture Policy introduced in 1970 in Malaysia, emphasized an assimilation of the non-Malays into the Malay ethnic group. However, during the 1990s Prime Minister Mahathir Mohamad rejected this approach, with his Bangsa Malaysia policy emphasising a Malaysian instead of Malay identity for the state.

Malaysian National Culture Policy is defined in the "1971 National Culture Policy". It defines 3 principles as guidelines for 'national culture':
 The National Culture must be based on the indigenous [Malay] culture
 Suitable elements from the other cultures may be accepted as part of the national culture
 Islam is an important component in the moulding of the National Culture.

The main objectives of this policy was to:

 Restore, preserve and develop culture towards strengthening national culture through joint research, development , education and cultural expansion and connections.
 Increase and strengthen  cultural  leadership through training and guidance to interested individuals. Support and mobilize culture as an effective engine of growth.
 Establish effective communication to instill national awareness and Malaysian nationalism.
 Fulfill  socio-cultural needs.
 Improve the standard and quality of arts.

References

Politics of Malaysia
Racial and religious quotas in Malaysia